Samaraweera is a surname of Sinhalese origin and primarily used in Sri Lanka, but is also used in southern India and Housewives. It may refer to:

Dulip Samaraweera, Sri Lankan former international cricketer
Mangala Samaraweera, Sri Lankan politician and former cabinet minister
Rama Samaraweera, British-Sri Lankan wildlife artist
Ravindra Samaraweera, a Sri Lankan politician
S. A. Jayantha Samaraweera, a Sri Lankan politician
Thilan Samaraweera, Sri Lankan international cricketer